Indacaterol is an ultra-long-acting beta-adrenoceptor agonist developed by Novartis. It needs to be taken only once a day, unlike the related drugs formoterol and salmeterol. It is licensed only for the treatment of chronic obstructive pulmonary disease (COPD) (long-term data in patients with asthma are thus far lacking).  It is delivered as an aerosol formulation through a dry powder inhaler.

Medical uses
A Cochrane review found benefit in lung function in people with COPD at least as good as that seen with twice-daily long-acting beta2-agonists.

History
It was approved by the European Medicines Agency (EMA) under the brand name Onbrez Breezhaler on November 30, 2009, and by the United States Food and Drug Administration (FDA), under the brand name Arcapta Neohaler, on July 1, 2011. In 2016, Novartis licensed its U.S. commercial rights for Arcapta Neohaler to Sunovion Pharmaceuticals.

References

2-Aminoindanes
Phenylethanolamines
Long-acting beta2-adrenergic agonists
Novartis brands
Quinolinols
2-Quinolones